Sagatta Dioloff is an arrondissement of Linguère in Louga Region in Senegal.

References 

Arrondissements of Senegal